Atlas America, Inc., until its acquisition by Chevron in 2010, was a natural gas and oil extraction company based in suburban Pittsburgh, Pennsylvania in the United States. The corporation was also involved in the transportation of resources and features a pipeline division. The base of operations for the company was in the Appalachian shale deposits, as well as in similar ones in the Midwest. Natural gas was processed by the company in facilities in Oklahoma and Texas.

References

External links
 

Companies listed on the New York Stock Exchange